Club de Fútbol Venta de Baños is a Spanish football team based in Venta de Baños, in the autonomous community of Castile and León. Founded in 1943, it plays in Primera Provincial de Palencia, holding home games at Amador Alonso, with a capacity of 3,500 seats.

Club's names
Club Deportivo Venta de Baños — (1943–2008)
Club de Fútbol Venta de Baños — (2008)–

Season to season

17 seasons in Tercera División

Notable former players
 Juanmi Gelabert

External links
Official website
futbolme.com profile

Football clubs in Castile and León
Association football clubs established in 1943
Divisiones Regionales de Fútbol clubs
1943 establishments in Spain
Province of Palencia